The Kyte River is a tributary of the Rock River, about  long, in northern Illinois in the United States. It is sometimes known locally as "Kyte Creek".  Via the Rock River, it is part of the watershed of the Mississippi River.

The Kyte River flows for its entire length in Ogle County.

See also
List of Illinois rivers

References

Columbia Gazetteer of North America entry
DeLorme (2003).  Illinois Atlas & Gazetteer.  Yarmouth, Maine: DeLorme.  .

Rivers of Illinois
Rivers of Ogle County, Illinois